Fan Yang (born ) is a Chinese male  track cyclist. He won the gold medal in the  team pursuit  at the 2016 Asian Cycling Championships.

References

External links
 Profile at cyclingarchives.com

1990 births
Living people
Chinese track cyclists
Chinese male cyclists
Place of birth missing (living people)
Olympic cyclists of China
Cyclists at the 2016 Summer Olympics
21st-century Chinese people